Tremolite is a member of the amphibole group of silicate minerals with composition: Ca2(Mg5.0-4.5Fe2+0.0-0.5)Si8O22(OH)2. Tremolite forms by metamorphism of sediments rich in dolomite and quartz. Tremolite forms a series with actinolite and ferro-actinolite. Pure magnesium tremolite is creamy white, but the color grades to dark green with increasing iron content. It has a hardness on Mohs scale of 5 to 6. Nephrite, one of the two minerals of the gemstone jade, is a green variety of tremolite.

The fibrous form of tremolite is one of the six recognised types of asbestos. This material is toxic, and inhaling the fibers can lead to asbestosis, lung cancer and both pleural and peritoneal mesothelioma. Fibrous tremolite is sometimes found as a contaminant in vermiculite, chrysotile (itself a type of asbestos) and talc.

Occurrence

Tremolite is an indicator of metamorphic grade since at high temperatures it converts to diopside.

Tremolite occurs as a result of contact metamorphism of calcium and magnesium rich siliceous sedimentary rocks and in greenschist facies metamorphic rocks derived from ultramafic or magnesium carbonate bearing rocks. Associated minerals include calcite, dolomite, grossular, wollastonite, talc, diopside, forsterite, cummingtonite, riebeckite and winchite.

Tremolite was first described in 1789 for an occurrence in Campolungo, Piumogna Valley, Leventina, Ticino (Tessin), Switzerland.

Fibrous tremolite 
One of the six recognized types of asbestos, approximately 40,200 tons of tremolite asbestos is mined annually in India.  It is otherwise found as a contaminant.

See also 
 Libby, Montana – location of asbestos-related ailments caused by tremolite

References 

 Mineral may unlock secrets of Venus's ancient oceans, New Scientist, 10 October 2007

Calcium minerals
Magnesium minerals
Asbestos
Amphibole group
Monoclinic minerals
Minerals in space group 12
Luminescent minerals